Mirmangan-e Olya (also Romanized as Mīrmangān-e ‘Olyā) is a village in Gowavar Rural District, Govar District, Gilan-e Gharb County, Kermanshah Province, Iran. At the 2006 census, its population was 431, in 96 families.

References 

Populated places in Gilan-e Gharb County